Carva is a Lean Steer elliptical cross-trainer, human-powered, tricycle. Two wheels in the front and one in the back. Used to simulate outdoor walking or running without causing excessive pressure to the joints, hence decreasing the risk of impact injuries.

Carva offers a non-impact cardiovascular workout that can vary from light to high intensity based on the riding preference chosen by the user.

Lean Steer
Steering mechanism actuated by degree of body lean and weight transfer.

Uses
Carva can be employed for many uses:
Recreation
Workout/Fitness

Brakes

Carva uses standard bicycle brakes like: rim brakes, in which friction pads are compressed against the wheel rims; internal hub brakes, in which the friction pads are contained within the wheel hubs; or disc brakes, with a separate rotor for braking.

With hand-operated brakes, force is applied to brake levers mounted on the handlebars and transmitted via Bowden cables or hydraulic lines to the friction pads. A rear hub brake may be either hand-operated or pedal-actuated, as in the back pedal coaster brakes which were popular in North America until the 1960s, and are common in children's bicycles.

See also
General
 StreetStrider
 Elliptical trainer
 Bicycle safety
 Bicycle tools
 List of bicycle parts
 Cardiovascular
 Cross-training

Special uses and related vehicle types
 Tricycle

Other
 Human-powered transport
 Safety standards
 Transportation technology, timeline of

Sources
 http://StreetStrider.com

External links
 Inventor is really from Alabama, David Kraus, PHD 3/19/2009

References 

Exercise equipment